The Cumbria rugby league team (known as Cumberland from 1898 to 1973) is an English representative rugby league team consisting of players who were born in the county of Cumbria and the historic county of Cumberland. They play fixtures against international representative sides, often acting as opposition in warm-up fixtures for touring international sides.

Team
The Cumbrian side features professional players from the Super League, the Co-operative Championship, Championship 1 and the amateur game.

As of 2010, Cumbria are coached by Paul Crarey, with assistant coaches; Gary Charlton of Workington Town, and David Seeds of Whitehaven.

History
Cumbria played the touring Australian Kangaroos during 14 Kangaroo Tours, including 1908-09 (twice), 1911-12, 1921-22, 1929–30, 1933–34, 1948–49, 1963-64, 1967-68, 1973, 1978, 1982, 1986, 1990 and 1994, as well as playing the Australians as part of their 1992 Rugby League World Cup Final tour. They also played New Zealand in 1907–08, 1926–27 and 1980.

During the 2004 Tri-Nations series Cumbria played a match against an 'ANZAC Combination' side made up of Australian and New Zealand squad members. The 64–12 loss was the largest ever suffered by the Cumbrian side.

Cumbria played the England national rugby league team as part of England's preparation for the 2010 Four Nations. The match raised funds for the Rugby Football League's benevolent fund and the family of Garry Purdham, who was among the victims of the Cumbria shootings tragedy on 2 June 2010. The game was watched by 5,250 spectators at Whitehaven's Recreation Ground and ended 18–18, raising over £50,000 for its cause.

In 2006, Cumbria defeated Tonga 28–16 at Derwent Park in Workington, while on 4 November 2007, Cumbria recorded its largest ever win when they defeated the United States 70–0 at Craven Park in Barrow-in-Furness.

2010 squad
The squad for the match against England on 3 October 2010.

Results
Results for the Cumberland / Cumbria rugby league team against international teams.

See also
 Rugby League War of the Roses

References

External links
The Rugby Football League